Kala Sanghian is a town in Kapurthala. It falls under the Kapurthala administration of Punjab state in India. It is one of the biggest towns in Kapurthala.

Transportation
Kala Sanghian lies approximately in the mid of Nakodar and Kapurthala. The nearest railway station to Kala Sanghian is Kapurthala railway station which is around 14 km. Sultanpur Lodhi is 27 km from Kala Sanghian and Jalandhar is 16 km from the Town.

Gurudwara
There is famous gurudwara , Baba Kahan Dass ji , in its Patti of Alamgir, Kapurthala

Climate
The Town has a humid subtropical climate with cool winters and long, hot summers. Summers last from April to June and winters from November to February. Temperatures in the summer vary from average highs of around 48 °C (118 °F) to average lows of around 25 °C (77 °F). Winter temperatures have highs of 19 °C (66 °F) to lows of −7 °C (19 °F). The climate is dry on the whole, except during the brief southwest monsoon season during July and August. The average annual rainfall is about 70 cm.

References

External links 

Villages in Kapurthala district